North Abington station is a former railroad station in North Abington, Massachusetts.  It is located across from the intersection of Harrison Avenue and Railroad Street, along what is today the Massachusetts Bay Transportation Authority's Plymouth/Kingston Line, and is now home to the Abington Depot restaurant.

History

The single-story Richardsonian Romanesque granite-and-brownstone building was designed by Bradford Lee Gilbert and built in 1893 by the New York, New Haven and Hartford Railroad (NYNH&H).  Construction on the building was begun immediately following the "North Abington Riot", in which railroad laborers and local townspeople fought over the town's right to allow a grade-level streetcar crossing over the NYNH&H track.  The legal case over this issue set a precedent in state legal jurisprudence that a single Massachusetts Supreme Judicial Court justice was sufficient to render binding interpretations of the law.

The building was listed on the National Register of Historic Places in 1976 as North Abington Depot.

See also
Abington station, in Abington
National Register of Historic Places listings in Plymouth County, Massachusetts

References

External links

Romanesque Revival architecture in Massachusetts
Railway stations in the United States opened in 1894
Railway stations on the National Register of Historic Places in Massachusetts
Buildings and structures in Plymouth County, Massachusetts
Stations along Old Colony Railroad lines
National Register of Historic Places in Plymouth County, Massachusetts
Former railway stations in Massachusetts